Bilangin ang Bituin sa Langit is a 1989 drama film directed by Elwood Perez and produced by Lily Monteverde. The film stars Nora Aunor and Tirso Cruz III and it chronicles the turbulent life-long relationship between Noli (Aunor), a poor and hard-working barrio lass, and Anselmo (Cruz), her childhood sweetheart.

Bilangin ang Bituin sa Langit won both the FAMAS Award for Best Picture and the FAP Award for Best Picture. Nora won Best Actress for this film in Urian, FAMAS, and FAP while Tirso won Best Actor in PMPC Star, FAMAS, and FAP.

Cast
Nora Aunor as Doña Magnolia "Noli" Dela Cruz vda. de Zulueta and Maggie Zulueta
Tirso Cruz III as Dr. Anselmo Santos and Anselmo Santos Jr.
Gloria Romero as Doña Martina Santos
Miguel Rodriguez as Señor Arturo Zulueta
Ana Margarita Gonzales as Margot Zulueta
Perla Bautista as Cedes Santos
Vangie Labalan as Matilde
Beverly Salviejo as Connie
Rolando Tinio as the principal
Manjo del Mundo as Noli's Brother

Production
The production of Bilangin ang Bituin sa Langit lasted nearly three years, with Regal Films announcing its completion on August 12, 1989.

Release
Bilangin ang Bituin sa Langit was released in the Philippines on August 17, 1989.

Critical response

Mario A. Hernando of Malaya Newspaper said that the film was "the quintessential" and "a loving tribute to the 'Golden Age of Philippine Cinema'" while Melissa G. Contreras of Manila Chronicle said that Aunor is a "prime mover in the movie" due to the emotions she showed in her character.

Awards and recognition

TV adaptation

In 2020, GMA Network remade the film into a TV series. It stars Nora Aunor who is also part of the original film as Cedes, Mylene Dizon as Magnolia "Nolie" and Kyline Alcantara as Margarita "Maggie".

References

External links

1989 films
Filipino-language films
Films set in the Philippines
Philippine drama films
Regal Entertainment films